Salvatore Vullo (born 30 October 1953 in Favara, Sicily) is an Italian football manager and former player who played as a defender for several Serie A and Serie B teams, including Palermo, Torino, Bologna, Sampdoria and Catania.

References

External links
Profile at Carrierecalciatori.it

1953 births
Living people
People from Favara, Sicily
Sportspeople from the Province of Agrigento
Italian footballers
Footballers from Sicily
Association football defenders
Serie A players
Serie B players
Palermo F.C. players
Olbia Calcio 1905 players
Torino F.C. players
Bologna F.C. 1909 players
U.C. Sampdoria players
U.S. Avellino 1912 players
Catania S.S.D. players
Italian football managers